American Modern Library may refer to:
 Modern Library
 Library of America